Normandy Dam is a dam built by the Tennessee Valley Authority (TVA) on the Duck River in the U.S. state of Tennessee. It straddles the border between Bedford and Coffee counties. Completed in 1976, the dam was built primarily for flood control and economic development purposes, and does not produce any electricity. The town of Normandy is located just southwest of the dam.   The water level in Normandy Reservoir varies about 11 feet in a normal year.

See also
Normandy Archaeological Project

References

External links

Normandy Reservoir — TVA site

Buildings and structures in Bedford County, Tennessee
Buildings and structures in Coffee County, Tennessee
Dams in Tennessee
Tennessee Valley Authority dams
Dams completed in 1976